Ignacio "Nacho" Monreal Eraso ( or ; born 26 February 1986) is a Spanish former professional footballer who played as a left-back or centre-back.

He started playing with Osasuna in 2005, going on to appear in 144 official games over the course of five La Liga seasons. In 2011 he signed with Málaga and, two years later, joined Arsenal, winning three FA Cup trophies with the latter club while taking part in 251 matches in all competitions. He ended his career in 2022 with Real Sociedad, winning the 2019–20 Copa del Rey.

A full international from 2009 to 2018, Monreal represented Spain at the 2013 Confederations Cup and the 2018 World Cup.

Club career

Osasuna

Born in Pamplona, Monreal was a product of CA Osasuna's youth system and made his official debut for his hometown club in an away game against Valencia CF on 22 October 2006, a 1–0 La Liga loss. He finished his first season with ten league appearances, adding two in that campaign's UEFA Champions League; after the Navarrese's relegation to the UEFA Cup, he appeared in four matches as the team reached the last four, being eliminated by fellow league side Sevilla FC.

Monreal became first-choice in 2007–08, retaining that status in the subsequent seasons, with another youth product, César Azpilicueta, being the undisputed starter in the other defensive wing.

Málaga
On 10 June 2011, Monreal signed a five-year contract with Málaga CF on a €6 million transfer fee. In his first season he initially battled for first-choice status with Eliseu, but ended up only missing seven games as the club finished fourth and qualified for the Champions League for the first time.

Monreal scored his only goal for the Andalusians on 27 January 2013, in a 3–2 away win over RCD Mallorca.

Arsenal

On 31 January 2013, Monreal joined English side Arsenal on a long-term contract for an undisclosed fee, believed by Sky Sports to be around £8.5 million. He was given the number 17 shirt, and made his Premier League debut against Stoke City two days later in a 1–0 home win.

On 23 February 2013, Monreal provided the assist for countryman Santi Cazorla to score the winner in a 2–1 victory over Aston Villa. He scored his first goal for the Gunners on 16 March, opening a 2–0 win at Swansea City.

Monreal returned from injury on 21 August 2013 to feature in Arsenal's 3–0 win at Fenerbahçe SK in the Champions League group stage play-off, playing the last three minutes in the place of Theo Walcott. On 26 September, he scored the deciding penalty in a shootout against West Bromwich Albion to send his team into the fourth round of the League Cup.

Upon the arrival of Alexis Sánchez in the 2014 off-season, Monreal took the vacant number 18 previously worn by Sébastien Squillaci. On 23 August, he assisted Olivier Giroud's late equaliser in a 2–2 draw against Everton. Additionally, an injury crisis in the squad saw him being deployed in an unfamiliar central defender role in a string of games, after Laurent Koscielny was put out of action due to an Achilles tendon injury.

On 9 March 2015, Monreal scored the opening goal in a 2–1 win over Manchester United at Old Trafford that put Arsenal through to the semi-finals of the FA Cup. He played the full 90 minutes in the decisive match, a 4–0 defeat of Aston Villa at Wembley Stadium.

On 19 January 2016, Monreal signed a new long-term contract. On 23 April 2017, he scored the vital equaliser as his team came from behind to defeat Manchester City in the FA Cup semi-final at Wembley.

On 6 November 2017, after good performances on the left side of a three-man defence, Monreal won the Professional Footballers' Association Player of the Month award for October of that year. The following 20 January, he netted once and made two assists before retiring injured 30 minutes into an eventual 4–1 home win against Crystal Palace.

Real Sociedad
Monreal returned to Spain on 31 August 2019, with the 33-year-old joining Real Sociedad on a two-year contract. He scored on his competitive debut two weeks later, converting an easy tap-in at the hour mark of an eventual 2–0 victory over Atlético Madrid at Anoeta Stadium.

Monreal missed the entire 2021–22 season, due to a knee injury. On 23 May 2022, the club announced his departure.

On 16 August 2022, Monreal announced his retirement at 36.

International career

In 2007, Monreal earned his first call for the Spain under-21 team. He started all their matches in the 2009 UEFA European Championship, in an eventual group stage exit.

On 6 August 2009, Monreal was called up to the senior side for the first time, for an exhibition game with Macedonia. He played the last 15 minutes for Joan Capdevila in a 3–2 away win; on 7 September 2010, in the nation's second game after they won the 2010 FIFA World Cup in South Africa, he played the entire 1–4 friendly loss to Argentina.

Monreal was a member of Spain's squad which reached the final of the 2013 FIFA Confederations Cup in Brazil, although he was second-choice left-back behind FC Barcelona's Jordi Alba. He started in the last two group games, beginning with a 10–0 thrashing of Tahiti at the Maracanã where he set up a David Villa goal.

Monreal scored his first goal for Spain on 12 November 2016, contributing to a 4–0 defeat of Macedonia for the 2018 World Cup qualifiers in Granada. He was then selected by manager Julen Lopetegui for the finals in Russia.

Style of play
Upon signing with Arsenal in 2013, the club's manager Arsène Wenger described Monreal as "a strong left-sided defender with good experience at both club and international level. He is a technically gifted player, a good crosser in the final third and strong in the air." Although he usually played as a defensive–minded left-back in a four-man back-line, he was also capable of playing as a centre-back or even as a left-sided defender in a back three.

Career statistics

Club

International

Spain score listed first, score column indicates score after each Monreal goal.

Honours
Arsenal
FA Cup: 2013–14, 2014–15, 2016–17
FA Community Shield: 2014, 2015, 2017
EFL Cup runner-up: 2017–18
UEFA Europa League runner-up: 2018–19

Real Sociedad
Copa del Rey: 2019–20

Spain
FIFA Confederations Cup runner-up: 2013

Individual
Professional Footballers' Association Fans' Player of the Month: October 2017

References

External links

Official Arsenal profile

1986 births
Living people
Spanish footballers
Footballers from Pamplona
Association football defenders
La Liga players
Segunda División B players
CA Osasuna B players
CA Osasuna players
Málaga CF players
Real Sociedad footballers
Premier League players
Arsenal F.C. players
FA Cup Final players
Spain youth international footballers
Spain under-21 international footballers
Spain international footballers
2013 FIFA Confederations Cup players
2018 FIFA World Cup players
Spanish expatriate footballers
Expatriate footballers in England
Spanish expatriate sportspeople in England